Kabeya-Kamwanga is a town of the Democratic Republic of the Congo and is the administrative center of Kabeya-Kamwanga territory of Kasaï-Oriental province. As of 2012, it had an estimated population of 31,408.

References 

Democratic Republic of the Congo